The TOTEM experiment (TOTal Elastic and diffractive cross section Measurement) is one of the nine detector experiments at CERN's Large Hadron Collider.  The other eight are: ATLAS, ALICE, CMS, LHCb, LHCf, MoEDAL, FASER and SND@LHC. It shares an interaction point with CMS. The detector aims at measurement of total cross section, elastic scattering, and diffraction processes. The primary instrument of the detector is referred to as a Roman pot. In December 2020, the D0 and TOTEM Collaborations made public the odderon discovery based on a purely data driven approach in a CERN and Fermilab approved preprint that was later published in Physical Review Letters. In this experimental observation, the TOTEM proton-proton data in the region of the diffractive minimum and maximum was extrapolated from 13, 8, 7 and 2.76 TeV to 1.96 TeV and compared this to D0 data at 1.96 TeV in the same t-range giving an odderon significance of 3.4 σ. When combined with TOTEM experimental data at 13 TeV at small scattering angles providing an odderon significance of 3.4 - 4.6 σ, the combination resulted in an odderon significance of at least 5.2 σ.

See also
CERN: European Organization for Nuclear Research
Large Hadron Collider

References

Further reading
 (Full design documentation)

External links
TOTEM Public Webpage
TOTEM section on US/LHC Website
TOTEM experiment record on INSPIRE-HEP

CERN experiments
Particle experiments
Large Hadron Collider